Maurice Far Eckhard Tió (born 26 July 1983 in Barcelona) is a cyclist from Spain.

Personal 
Eckhard has cerebral palsy. In 2013, he was awarded the bronze Real Orden al Mérito Deportivo.

Cycling
Eckhard is a C2 type athlete. He competed at the 2004 Summer Paralympics and the 2008 Summer Paralympics in cycling, where he did not earn a medal. He competed at the 2012 Summer Paralympics in cycling. He was the third person to finish in the C2 road trial race.

From the Catalan region of Spain, he was a recipient of a 2012 Plan ADO scholarship. In 2013, he was one of seven Paralympic sportspeople to get a 2013/2014 "Iberdrola Foundation Scholarship" that was awarded by the Spanish Paralympic Committee, Iberdrola Foundation, the Spanish Sports Council and the Spanish Ministry of Social Services and Equality. It provided him with €490 a month for the ten academic months of the year.

References

External links 
  (2004)
  (2008)
  (2012)
  (2016)
 

1983 births
Living people
Spanish male cyclists
Paralympic cyclists of Spain
Paralympic bronze medalists for Spain
Paralympic medalists in cycling
Cyclists at the 2004 Summer Paralympics
Cyclists at the 2008 Summer Paralympics
Cyclists at the 2012 Summer Paralympics
Medalists at the 2012 Summer Paralympics
Cyclists from Barcelona
Plan ADOP alumni